KMIX (100.9 FM, "La Tricolor 100.9") is a radio station broadcasting a Regional Mexican format. Licensed to Tracy, California, United States, it serves the Stockton area.  The station is currently owned by Entravision Communications.

History
The station began broadcasting December 14, 1966. For many years, the station was a sister station to KWG. The station's original call sign was KSRT (for Stereo Radio Tracy). From the late 1960s to the early 1970s, the station aired a Spanish language format. In the early to mid 1970s (1973) through the very early 1980s (1981) KSRT aired an album-oriented rock format. On May 6, 1981, the station's call sign was changed to KWGF. In 1983, the station's call sign was changed to KYBB (B-101). From the mid to late 1980s, the station aired an adult contemporary format. By 1989, the station was airing an Oldies format, and on June 26, 1990, the station's call sign was changed to KSGO (Stockton's Golden Oldies). On December 1, 1992, the station's call sign was changed to KEXX (Xtra 101). By 1995, the station's oldies format had evolved to a playlist centered on hits of the 1970s.

KEXX dropped 1970s oldies for country music in 1995, changing its letters to KMIX. By 1997, KMIX was airing a Spanish language format.

References

External links

MIX
1966 establishments in California
Radio stations established in 1966
MIX
Entravision Communications stations